Deh Bakri Rural District is a rural district (dehestan) in the Central District of Bam County, Kerman Province, Iran. At the 2006 census, its population was 6,314, in 1,600 families. The rural district has 28 villages.

References 

Rural Districts of Kerman Province
Bam County